is one of the eleven wards in the city of Kyoto, in Kyoto Prefecture, Japan.

History 
The meaning of ukyō (右京) is "on the Emperor's right." When residing in the Kyoto Imperial Palace the emperor would sit facing south, thus the western direction would be to his right. Similarly, there is a ward to the east called Sakyō-ku (左京区), meaning "the ward on the Emperor's left." In old times, ukyō was referring to the western part of the capital. The area of ancient Ukyō slightly overlaps the area of present Ukyō-ku.

The ward was established in 1931 when nine villages merged to form it.

On April 1, 2005, the ward expanded its territory to the area of former town of Keihoku when the town merged into the city of Kyoto.

Geography

Mountains 
 Mount Atago
 Mount Ogura
 Iwatayama

Rivers 
 Katsura River
 Tenjin River (Kamiya River)
 Arisugawa
 Yugegawa

Adjacent municipalities 
 Kyoto wards of: Kita-ku, Sakyo-ku, Nakagyo-ku, Shimogyo-ku, Nishikyo-ku, and Minami-ku.
 Kameoka, Kyoto
 Nantan, Kyoto

Sights 
Ukyo-ku is home to many renowned sites, including:

 Arashiyama, a hill famed for its maple leaves and the Togetsu-kyō, the Bridge to the Moon
 Ninna-ji, a Buddhist temple with a fine pagoda
 Ryōan-ji, the Zen Buddhist temple with the karesansui (dry-landscape, i.e. raked stones) garden
 Tenryū-ji, the head temple of the Tenryū branch of Rinzai Zen Buddhism 
 Sagano, a neighborhood with Sagano Romantic Train and many temples, including the Nonomiya Shrine as well as Rakushi-sha, the Fallen Persimmon Hut
 Uzumasa, the location of Kōryū-ji, a temple founded before Kyoto became the Imperial capital. The neighborhood is also the home of the Toei Uzumasa Eigamura studios and the center of Japan's television and film industries.

Economy 
Rohm, an electronic parts manufacturer, and Nissin Electric, a global electrical equipment company, are headquartered in the ward.

Education

Senior high schools 
 Kyoto Prefectural Sagano High School
 Kyoto Gaidai Nishi High School
 Kitasaga Senior High School (:ja:京都府立北嵯峨高等学校)
 Kitakuwada High School (:ja:京都府立北桑田高等学校)
 Hanazono Senior High School (花園高等学校)
 Kyoto Gakuen High School (:ja:京都学園高等学校)
 Kyoto Koka Senior High School (京都光華高等学校)

Universities 
 Kyoto University of Foreign Studies
 Kyoto University of Advanced Science - Kyoto Uzumasa Campus
 Kyoto Koka Women's University
 Kyoto Saga University of Arts

Middle schools 
There are 12 middle schools, of which nine are public and three are private.

Elementary schools 
There are 21 elementary schools, of which 20 are public and one is private.

Others 
 North Korean school: Kyoto Korean No. 2 Elementary School (京都朝鮮第二初級学校).

Sights of Ukyo-ku

References

External links

 Ukyō official website

Wards of Kyoto